Berry Park is a small rural locality within the City of Maitland, New South Wales. It is located approximately 132 km from the capital Sydney covering an area of 8.811 square kilometres.

Population 
In 2016 Berry Park population was 127 people with a median age of 46. 84.3 were born in Australia and 2.3% spoke German. 35.3% Catholics, 16.5% no religion (so described), 15.0% Anglican, 12.0% not stated and 6.8% Uniting Church.

References

Suburbs of Maitland, New South Wales